George Mainwaring may refer to:

 Captain Mainwaring, fictional character in the television sitcom Dad's Army
 George Mainwaring (MP) (before 1551–1628), English politician
 George Mainwaring (1642-1695), English politician
 George Boulton Mainwaring (c. 1773–?), British member of parliament for Middlesex